General Sir Hugh Arbuthnott, KCB (1780 – 11 June 1868) was a British Army officer and Member of Parliament for Kincardineshire 1826–1865.

He was born the son of John Arbuthnott, 7th Viscount of Arbuthnott and the younger brother of John Arbuthnott, 8th Viscount of Arbuthnott.

He entered the 79th Regiment of Foot (Cameron Highlanders) as Ensign in May 1796 and was promoted Major-General on 22 July 1830, Lt-General on 23 November 1841 and full General on 20 June 1854.

He was given the colonelcy of the 38th (1st Staffordshire) Regiment of Foot from 1843 to 1862, transferring as colonel back to the Cameron Highlanders from 14 March 1862 to his death in 1868.

Sir Hugh never married.

References

Notes

External links

|-

|-

1780 births
1868 deaths
Younger sons of viscounts
British Army generals
Members of the Parliament of the United Kingdom for Scottish constituencies
UK MPs 1826–1830
UK MPs 1830–1831
UK MPs 1831–1832
UK MPs 1832–1835
UK MPs 1835–1837
UK MPs 1837–1841
UK MPs 1841–1847
UK MPs 1847–1852
UK MPs 1852–1857
UK MPs 1857–1859
UK MPs 1859–1865
Knights Commander of the Order of the Bath
Queen's Own Cameron Highlanders officers
52nd Regiment of Foot officers